Nephopterygia is a monotypic snout moth genus described by Hans Georg Amsel in 1965. Its only species, N. austeritella, described by the same author, is found on the Canary Islands, as well as in Sudan and Egypt.

References

Phycitinae
Monotypic moth genera
Moths of Africa
Pyralidae genera
Taxa named by Hans Georg Amsel